For a more comprehensive list of mobile phone operators, see Mobile country codes.

Terrestrial 
This is a list of the world's thirty largest terrestrial mobile phone network operators measured by number of subscriptions.

Satellite based
This is a list of the world's five largest satellite phone network operators measured by number of subscribers.

By region 
 List of mobile network operators of the Americas
 List of mobile network operators of the Asia Pacific region
 List of mobile network operators of Europe
 List of mobile network operators of the Middle East and Africa

See also 

 Comparison of mobile phone standards
 List of countries by number of broadband Internet subscriptions
 List of countries by number of Internet users
 List of countries by number of telephone lines in use
 List of countries by smartphone penetration
 List of multiple-system operators
 List of telephone operating companies
 Mobile country code (List of MCC/MNC assigned to mobile networks)

Footnotes

References

External links 
 List of all mobile network operators in the World divided by country